= November 2026 Arizona floods =

2026 flooding event in Phoenix, AZ, USA

- Satellite imagery of the storm system responsible for the flooding

Meteorological history
- Date: November 1 - November 6, 2026 (6 days)

Overall effects
- Fatalities: 2 total
- Damage: Unknown

The 2026 Phoenix floods are currently a series of floods that are threatening portions of Phoenix, Arizona, and the surrounding areas.
